Brachyuranochampsa is an extinct genus of crocodilian.

The only robust occurrence of Brachyuranochampsa is B. eversolei from the Middle Eocene of Wyoming.  Another species, B. zangerli from the lower Bridger Formation at Grizzly Buttes, has been synonymized with another primitive crocodilian, "Crocodylus" affinis, also known from the Bridger Formation.

Phylogenetic studies have consistently recovered Brachyuranochampsa as more basal than the crown group Crocodylidae, which consists of all extant (living) crocodiles.

The below cladogram from a 2018 study combining morphological data and molecular DNA evidence shows the placement of Brachyuranochampsa within Crocodylia.

References

External links
 Brachyuranochampsa in the Paleobiology Database

Crocodilians
Late Cretaceous crocodylomorphs of North America
Paleocene crocodylomorphs
Late Cretaceous reptiles of North America
Eocene crocodylomorphs
Prehistoric pseudosuchian genera